The 30th Venice Biennale, held in 1960, was an exhibition of international contemporary art, with 34 participating nations. The Venice Biennale takes place biennially in Venice, Italy. Winners of the Gran Premi (Grand Prize) included French painter Jean Fautrier, German painter Hans Hartung, Italian painter Emilio Vedova, and Italian sculptor Pietro Consagra.

References

Bibliography

Further reading 

 
 
 
 
 
 
 
 
 
 
 
 
 
 
 
 
 
 
 
 
 
 
 

1960 in art
1960 in Italy
Venice Biennale exhibitions